Pyrgulina epentromidea is a species of sea snail, a marine gastropod mollusk in the family Pyramidellidae, the pyrams and their allies.

Distribution
This marine species occurs in the Red Sea, off Vietnam and in the Gulf of Thailand.

References

 Saurin, E. (1959). Pyramidellidae de Nha-Trang (Viet-Nam). Annales de la Faculté des Sciences de Saigon. (1959): 223–283, pl. 1–9.
 Saurin, E. (1961). Pyramidellidae du Golfe de Thailande. Annales de la Faculte des Sciences de Saigon. (1961): 231–266, pl. 1–5.

External links
 To World Register of Marine Species

Pyramidellidae
Gastropods described in 1899